Sir Herbert Baker  (9 June 1862 – 4 February 1946) was an English architect remembered as the dominant force in South African architecture for two decades, and a major designer of some of New Delhi's most notable government structures. He was born and died at Owletts in Cobham, Kent.

Among the many churches, schools and houses he designed in South Africa are the Union Buildings in Pretoria, St. Andrew's College, Grahamstown, St. John's College, Johannesburg, the Wynberg Boys' High School, Groote Schuur in Cape Town, and the Champagne Homestead and Rhodes Cottage on Boschendal, between Franschhoek and Stellenbosch. With Sir Edwin Lutyens he was instrumental in designing, among other buildings, Viceroy's House, Parliament House, and the North and South Blocks of the Secretariat, all in New Delhi, which in 1931 became the capital of the British Raj, as well as its successor states the Dominion of India and the Republic of India. In 1928 he also designed the European School, Nairobi, the original co-education primary school of both Nairobi School and The Kenya High School. His other prominent works include the East African Railways Headquarters, Government House and the administration building at the then Prince of Wales School in Nairobi. His tomb is in Westminster Abbey.

Life and career

The fourth son of nine children of Thomas Henry Baker (1824–1904), J.P., of Owletts, a gentleman farmer and director of the Kent Fire and Life Insurance Company, by his wife Frances Georgina (née Davis), Herbert was from the outset exposed to a tradition of good craftsmanship, preserved through isolation in the neighbourhood of his home in Kent. As a boy, walking and exploring the historical ruins found in the area were his favourite pastimes. Here he observed and learned to appreciate the time-honoured materials of brick and plaster, and the various aspects of timber use, especially in roof construction—tie-beam and arch-braced collar-beam trusses. He was profoundly influenced by the stone construction used in Norman cathedrals and Anglo-Saxon churches, as well as the ornamentation and symbolism of the Renaissance buildings in Kent. This early influence is apparent in the churches, schools and houses he later designed in South Africa.

He was educated at Tonbridge School. In 1879 he was articled to his cousin Arthur Baker, embarking on the accepted pattern of architectural education comprising three years of apprenticeship and the attending of classes at the Architectural Association School and the Royal Academy Schools. Study tours of Europe were regarded as an essential part of the course. In 1891 Baker passed his examination for Associateship of the Royal Institute of British Architects and was awarded the Ashpitel Prize for being top of his class.

He worked initially for Ernest George and Harold Peto in London from 1882 to 1887, then opened his own office in Gravesend, Kent, in 1890. From 1902 to 1913 he developed his career in South Africa. In 1913 he returned to England and began practice in London in partnership with Alexander Scott. Near the end of this most productive phase of his career, Baker received a knighthood (in the 1926 King's Birthday Honours List), was elected to the Royal Academy, received the Royal Institute of British Architects' Royal Gold Medal in 1927, and received honorary degrees from Witwatersrand and Oxford Universities. Baker's autobiography Architecture & Personalities was published in 1944.

South Africa

He embarked for South Africa in 1892 ostensibly to visit his brother, and was commissioned in 1893 by Cecil Rhodes to remodel Groote Schuur, Rhodes' house on the slopes of Table Mountain in Cape Town, and the residence of South African Prime Ministers. Rhodes sponsored Baker's further education in Greece, Italy and Egypt, after which he returned to South Africa and stayed the next twenty years.

In South Africa, Baker first partnered with Masey and Sloper, from 1903 to 1907. In 1904, he appointed Francis Leonard Fleming as his assistant, eventually becoming partners with Fleming in 1910 and working together until 1918, when Baker cut ties with the South Africa office.

He had the patronage of Lord Milner, and was invited to the Transvaal to design and build residences for the British living there. Much taken with the country, and notably with the Cape Dutch homes in the Cape Province, Baker resolved to remain in South Africa and to establish an architectural practice, which went under the name of Herbert Baker, Kendall & Morris. Baker undertook work in widespread parts of the country including Durban, Grahamstown, King William's Town, Bloemfontein, George and Oudtshoorn, and even further afield in Salisbury, Rhodesia, where he designed the Anglican Cathedral and a house for Julius Weil, the general merchant.

In 1902, Baker left his practice at the Cape in the hands of his partner and went to live in Johannesburg, where he built Stonehouse. On a visit to the United Kingdom in 1904, he married his cousin, Florence Edmeades, daughter of Gen. Henry Edmund Edmeades, bringing her back to Johannesburg, where two sons, the first of four children, were born. Baker quickly became noted for his work, and was commissioned by a number of the "Randlords" (the wealthy mining magnates of Johannesburg) to design houses, particularly in the suburbs of Parktown and Westcliff. He also designed commercial premises and public buildings.

Some Herbert Baker buildings in South Africa 

 Beach road Muizenberg, Cape Town
 St Boniface Church, Germiston
 Bishop Bavin School, St. George's
 Bishop's Lea, George
 Cecil John Rhodes Cottage, Boschendal
 Champagne Homestead, Boschendal
 Dale College Boys' High School, King William's Town
 Glenshiel, Johannesburg
 Grey College, Bloemfontein
 Groote Schuur, Cape Town. Presidential residence (1910 to 1984)
 Helpmekaar Kollege
 Honoured Dead Memorial in Kimberley, Northern Cape
 Jeppe High School for Boys
 Mandela Rhodes Place, Cape Town
 St. Mary's Anglican Church, Rosettenville
 McClean telescope building, Royal Observatory, Cape Town
 Michaelhouse, Balgowan, KwaZulu-Natal
 Droxford House (Kitchener road), Pietermaritzburg 
 Ou Meul Huis, De la Bat Skool vir Dowes, Worcester, Western Cape
 The Outspan, Parktown, Johannesburg
 Pallinghurst, Parktown, Johannesburg
 Northwards, Johannesburg
 Pilrig House, 1 Rockridge Road, Parktown
 Pretoria Station
 Rhodes Memorial, Cape Town. Baker used a design similar to the Greek Temple at Segesta.
 Rhodes University, Grahamstown
 Roedean School, Johannesburg
 Sandown House, Rondebosch, Cape Town. Property of Charles William Hutton and then of John Molteno.
 School House, Bishops Diocesan College, Rondebosch, Cape Town
 South African Institute for Medical Research, Johannesburg
 St. Andrew's College, Grahamstown chapel
 St Andrew's School for Girls, Johannesburg
 St Anne's College Chapel in Pietermaritzburg
 St. George's Cathedral, Cape Town
 St. John's College, Johannesburg
 St Margaret's (1905) Rockridge Road, Parktown
 St Mary's Cathedral, Johannesburg
 St. Martin's School (Rosettenville)
 St Michael and All Angels, Observatory, Cape Town
 St Michael and All Angels Anglican Church, Boksburg
 Stone House, Rockridge Road, Parktown. Baker's own house and the first he built in Johannesburg
 Union Buildings, Pretoria
 Villa Arcadia, Johannesburg
 Workers' Village at Lanquedoc, Boschendal
 Welgelegen Manor, Balfour, Mpumalanga
 Wynberg Boys' High School, Cape Town (now housing the Junior School)
 The Rectory, Simon's Town - Simon's Town Museum

Union Buildings, South Africa

In 1909 Baker was commissioned to design the Government Building of the Union of South Africa (which was formed on 31 May 1910) in Pretoria. Pretoria was to become the administrative centre for the new government. In November 1910, the cornerstone of the Union Buildings was laid.

Lord Selborne and Henry Charles Hull, a member of the first Union Cabinet, chose Meintjieskop as the site for Baker's design. The site was that of a disused quarry and the existing excavations were used to create the amphitheatre, which was set about with ornamental pools, fountains, sculptures, balustrades, and trees.

The design consisted of two identical wings, joined by a semi-circular colonnade forming the backdrop of the amphitheatre. The colonnade was terminated on either side by a tower. Each wing had a basement and three floors above ground. The interiors were created in the Cape Dutch Style with carved teak fanlights, heavy doors, and dark ceiling beams contrasting with white plaster walls and heavy wood furniture. Baker used indigenous materials as far as possible. The granite was quarried on site while Buiskop sandstone was used for the courtyards. 

Stinkwood and Rhodesian teak were used for timber and wood panelling. The roof tiles and quarry tiles for the floors were made in Vereeniging. The Union Buildings were completed in 1913, after which Baker left for New Delhi from where he returned home to England.

Rhodes Cottage, Boschendal South Africa
In 1897, Cecil John Rhodes started large scale fruit farming in the Drakenstein Valley and commissioned Baker to design his country retreat on the farm Nieuwedorp at Boschendal. In contrast to the spectacular mountain views, the brief was to design a simple country cottage combining Cape cottage features and incorporating indigenous yellowwood and stinkwood in the interior. It was intended to accommodate only Rhodes, his secretary and a butler.

The first name recorded in the guestbook was that of Sir Alfred Milner, erstwhile Governor of the Cape Colony and British High Commissioner at the outbreak of the South African War (Boer War). The cottage was later to host the Duke and Duchess of Devonshire, the Earl of Athlone, former Governor-General of South Africa, and his wife Princess Alice, granddaughter of Queen Victoria.

In the 1990s the cottage was revamped and refitted while preserving its character. It stands on Estate 20, one of the Founders' Estates which form Phase 1 of the residential development of Boschendal.

India

In 1912 Baker went to India to work with Lutyens, and went on to design the Secretariat Building in New Delhi and Parliament House, also in New Delhi. He also designed the bungalows of Members of Parliament in New Delhi. Baker designed the two Secretariat buildings flanking the great axis leading to what was then Viceroy's House, the palace of the Viceroy of India, now known as Rashtrapati Bhavan (President's House).

United Kingdom
Works from 1913 include:

 War Memorial Building, Harrow on the Hill (English Heritage TQ1534987385)
South Africa House, the South African High Commission building in Trafalgar Square, London
India House, Aldwych (1925–1930), the Indian High Commission, opened by King George V on 8 July 1930.
The Port Lympne Mansion (now a zoo) in Kent in south-east England
One of the grandstands at Lord's Cricket Ground in London; Baker presented the Marylebone Cricket Club with Old Father Time, a weather vane in the shape of Father Time, which adorned his stand until it was replaced in 1996. The weather vane, now a famous symbol of the home of cricket, was moved to another stand at the ground. He also designed the Grace Gates at Lord's.
The North Range of Downing College, Cambridge. The design was based on that of the original architect of the college, Williams Wilkins.
Rebuilding of the Bank of England, London, demolishing most of Sir John Soane's original building. Described by Nikolaus Pevsner in 'Buildings of England' as "the greatest architectural crime, in the City of London, of the twentieth century".
The War Cloister at Winchester College.
Rhodes House in Oxford, headquarters of the Rhodes Scholarships.
Goodenough College, London.
 Scott Polar Research Institute, Cambridge (1933–34).
 Busby's House, Westminster School, situated at 23 Great College Street. The building was erected in 1936.
 Church House, Westminster, built throughout the late 30s and opened by King George VI on 10 June 1940.

War memorials
Ascot War Memorial, Berkshire
Wadhurst War Memorial, East Sussex
Blackmoor War Memorial, Hampshire
Hampshire, Isle of Wight and Winchester War Memorial, Winchester Cathedral, Hampshire
Hatfield War Memorial, Hertfordshire
County of Kent War Memorial Cross, Canterbury, Kent
Harrow School War Memorial Building, Harrow School, London
Etchingham War Memorial, East Sussex

Belgium

Following the First World War, Baker was appointed one of four principal architects by the Imperial War Graves Commission to design war cemeteries and monuments for British Commonwealth soldiers killed in the conflict. Out of this came the design for Tyne Cot Cemetery, the largest British war cemetery in the world sited in Passchendaele near Ypres in Belgium, opened in July 1927. Baker had earlier designed the war memorial at Winchester College, influences for which he carried over to his work on Tyne Cot.

Kenya

Sir Edward Grigg, Governor of Kenya from 1925 to 1931, invited Baker to visit Kenya in 1925.

Baker wrote: "The Governor and Director of Education were much concerned to provide a healthy education for the European youth under the conditions of the climate. So with their encouragement I designed a school at Nairobi with a crypt as a playground – like the undercroft of Wren's library at Trinity College, Cambridge, – where the boys could stay at mid-day instead of going home under the vertical rays of the sun. At the larger 'public school' at Kabete all the detached classrooms and houses were designed and built with connecting colonnades, in which respect I followed the excellent example set by [United States] President Jefferson in his beautiful University of Virginia." The use of colonnades accords with advice given to Baker by T. E. Lawrence, who regarded the tropical sun as "an enemy" and told him "All pavements should be covered over with light vaulting." The foundation stone was laid by Sir Edward Grigg on 24 September 1929, and the Prince of Wales School was opened in 1931 (The original idea for the name of the school was Kabete Boys Secondary School, but the first headmaster, Captain Bertram W. L. Nicholson, thought this to be too clumsy and therefore the name of The Prince of Wales School was suggested and eventually adopted).

Other impressive buildings in Nairobi designed by Baker and completed with his assistant, Jan Hoogterp, include the East African Railways Headquarters, Law Courts and Government House (now State House), described as a Palladian mansion. However, the building with the closest resemblance to the Prince of Wales School may well be Baker's Government House (now State House) near the lighthouse at Ras Serani, Mombasa. Not only has it "large columned loggias", but it also has an archway, through which can be glimpsed the Indian Ocean, leading Baker to wax poetic: "One can live out between these columns both by day and night in the warm and soft sea air."
Prince of Wales School, Nairobi

France
Post the First World War, Baker worked on cemeteries in France including:

 Adanac Military Cemetery
 Australian Imperial Force burial ground
 Delville Wood Cemetery and Memorial
 Courcelette Memorial, Canadian war memorial
 Dantzig Alley British Cemetery
 Flatiron Copse Cemetery
 Le Trou Aid Post Cemetery
 London Cemetery and Extension
 Loos Memorial, Loos-en-Gohelle
 Ovillers Military Cemetery
 Quarry Cemetery, Montauban
 Tannay British Cemetery, Thiennes

Australia

Fairbridge Chapel was built at Pinjarra, Western Australia, in 1924 according to Herbert Baker's design, which he provided free of charge. The farm was started by Kingsley Fairbridge as part of a scheme to help destitute English children improve their lot by emigration to Australia and Canada.
Fairbridge Church, Pinjarra, Western Australia

Zimbabwe
The cathedral of Saint Mary's and all Saints was built at Harare, Zimbabwe, the first Anglican church in fort Salisbury, now Harare, was a pole and dagga hut built in 1891 by Canon Balfour on the west side of Harare street between Albion and Speke avenues. A pro cathedral was begun the following year to the north of the present cathedral. It was built of brick and corrugated iron, under the direction of Archdeacon Upcher. The building seemed quite unusable as a cathedral despite having an iron nave by 1898 and extended in 1911.

the parishioners decided that they needed a better cathedral but they were extremely ambitious, and employed the services of architect Francis Masey. When he died in 1912, Sir Hebert Baker, his former partner, took over the project. Baker is credited for designing the Union Buildings in Pretoria, South Africa, and worked with architect Lytuens on the master plan of New Delhi in India. Baker designed the cathedral in the Romanesque architectural style with round arches and round windows. A tall circular bell tower was intended to be reference to the conical tower from the great Zimbabwe, but the idea was not pursued because it made the bell tower look like a lighthouse.

References

 Jackson, P. (1995). Historic Buildings of Harare. Harare: Quest Publishing.

External links

 Profile on Royal Academy of Arts Collections
University of Cape Town Archives - Architectural drawings
Official Boschendal website
Official Boschendal the Estate website

British neoclassical architects
1862 births
1946 deaths
Architects from Kent
Commonwealth War Graves Commission
Recipients of the Royal Gold Medal
Knights Bachelor
People from Cobham, Kent
People educated at Tonbridge School
Burials at Westminster Abbey
19th-century English architects
20th-century English architects
Fellows of the Royal Institute of British Architects
Royal Academicians
History of Pretoria
Herbert Baker buildings and structures
British expatriates in South Africa